Eric Joseph Poole (December 19, 1907 – January 1, 1969) was a building contractor and a Canadian federal politician.

Political career
Poole first ran for political office in the 1935 Canadian federal election as a Social Credit candidate. He defeated incumbent Member of Parliament Alfred Speakman to pick up the seat for his party and win his only term in office.

Poole was one of nine federal members of parliament to attend the founding political convention of the Quebec Social Credit League in Hull, Quebec on January 29, 1939. The event was attended by over 700 delegates.

Later that year in a speech in the House of Commons on April 15, 1939, Poole criticized the Liberal and Conservative parties for failing to create employment. He proposed a 50-year plan to pay off the national debt and create mass employment by hiring out-of-work Canadians to reforest all the vacant and deforested land in Canada.

Poole served a single term in opposition before retiring from federal politics in 1940. He had intended to stand for a second term but was rejected by the Social Credit advisory board from standing as a New Democracy-Social Credit candidate on February 27, 1940.

After his career in federal politics Poole enlisted in the Canadian Forces joining the Army in World War II he served as a Sapper. He ran as a candidate in the 1944 Alberta general election in the service men vote held in January 1945. He was defeated well back, finishing fourth in the field of twenty-two candidates.

References

External links
 

Members of the House of Commons of Canada from Alberta
Social Credit Party of Canada MPs
Canadian military personnel of World War II
Independent candidates in Alberta provincial elections
1907 births
1969 deaths